Hemlata Kala (born 15 August 1975) is an Indian former cricketer who played as a right-handed batter and right-arm medium bowler. She appeared in seven Test matches, 78 One Day Internationals and one Twenty20 International for India between 1999 and 2008. She played domestic cricket for Uttar Pradesh and Railways.

Test centuries

References

External links
 
 

1975 births
Living people
Sportspeople from Agra
Indian women cricketers
India women Test cricketers
India women One Day International cricketers
India women Twenty20 International cricketers
Uttar Pradesh women cricketers
Railways women cricketers
Central Zone women cricketers
East Zone women cricketers